Full Throttle is a launched roller coaster located in Six Flags Plaza at Six Flags Magic Mountain in Valencia, California. Designed and manufactured by Premier Rides, the ride opened to the public on June 22, 2013. It featured the world's tallest vertical loop of  when it opened, a record that was surpassed in 2016 by Flash at Lewa Adventure in Xianyang, China. Its top hat element is also unique in the way it is situated on top of a vertical loop.

History
In late 2012 Baltimore-based roller coaster manufacturer Premier Rides was announced as the builder of the coaster.  Construction of Full Throttle started shortly after the Log Jammer log flume was closed on October 31, 2011. In March 2012, details of a launched roller coaster named Full Throttle were leaked to the Los Angeles Times. On April 4, 2012, Six Flags trademarked the name Full Throttle.

On August 28, 2012, Six Flags Magic Mountain officially announced Full Throttle. Along with Full Throttle there would be a new themed section to host the new coaster.

In mid-November 2012, construction walls went up, blocking off the construction site in Six Flags Plaza. For the new themed section, What the Fried? (restaurant) and Warner Bros. Kids' Club (theater) were demolished before the construction walls went up. By mid-December, the first pieces of Full Throttle's track had arrived on site. In late February, Full Throttle started to become vertical until April 12, 2013 when it was complete.

Six Flags Magic Mountain confirmed on Twitter that Full Throttle would open on June 22, 2013. Later that year in November, seat belts were installed on both Full Throttle and Goliath. A permanent covering over the loading station was also added during this time.

Ride experience
The train is launched out of the station from  using a linear synchronous motor. The launch immediately enters the record-breaking giant  vertical loop, followed by a high-banked curve to the right and another to the left as the train approaches the second inversion, a dive loop. This inversion drops down into a tunnel previously used for the park's monorail system, where the train comes to a halt. The train is then launched backwards out of the tunnel and partially up the dive loop. Once it loses its backward momentum, the train returns forward into the tunnel and is launched out of the tunnel and straight into a high-G turn to the left. Riders then go up the top hat that is located on top of the loop. Riders drop from the hill and reach the brake run before entering a 180-degree turn to the left back into the station. Duration of the  ride is under one minute.

Trains
The train is configured in a 2 trains with 3 cars per train layout. Riders are arranged 2 across in 3 rows for a total of 18 riders per train. The roller coaster configuration makes the capacity of 800 riders per hour.

Plaza and station
Full Throttle's station was once open aired, but shade has since been placed over the station. Its theme is unlike other coasters in the park. In front of the station is a dining area and gift shop in a building with "Full Throttle" badging. There is also a stage where dance parties are often held featuring a DJ, drum player, and "Full Throttle dancers."

Reception
Upon its building, Full Throttle received positive reviews from critics. Brady MacDonald of the Los Angeles Times states, "you ride Full Throttle and there's only one reaction: wow". MacDonald claims the ride starts "silky smooth and whisper quiet" and launches as a "rocket-fast launch". MacDonald criticized the activation of the brakes as the train descends the top hat.

Records
Upon debut, Full Throttle surpassed Superman: Krypton Coaster at Six Flags Fiesta Texas for the tallest vertical loop on a roller coaster.  In January 2016 the record was conceded to Mack-manufactured Flash at Lewa Adventure amusement park located in China. However, Full Throttle's loop remains the tallest loop in North America.

The coaster features a top hat element, unique in the way it is situated at the top of the vertical loop.

Awards

References

External links

 
 

Six Flags Magic Mountain
Roller coasters introduced in 2013
Roller coasters in California
Roller coasters operated by Six Flags
2013 establishments in California